Khandaker Muhammad Asad (born 1983), known as K M Asad, is a Bangladeshi documentary photographer and photojournalist. He is currently a photojournalist at Zuma Press news agency and contributor photographer for Getty images. 

He won a 3rd Prize award at the 2021 World Press Photo for his Climate Crisis Solutions: Collecting Drinking Water in Kalabogi.

Early life
Asad graduated with a degree in photography from Pathshala (The South Asian Media Academy) in 2008.

Career
In 2007, when Cyclone Sidr hit Bangladesh, Asad went to remote places to capture the conditions of local people. He also covered the 7.8 earthquake in Nepal in 2015.

His work has been published by The Guardian, Time, CNN, BBC, New Internationalist, The New York Times, Asia Time, The Telegraph, Days Japan, Paris Match, National Geographic (August 2019 cover picture) Discovery Channel magazine, Feature shoot, The Wall Street Journal, Saudi Aramco world magazine, MSNBC and Smithsonian.

Awards

2013, Pictures of the Year International (POYI) News picture story- Freelance/Agency –"First Place"
2014, Sony World Photography Awards professional current affair – Shortlist
2014, Deeper perspective photographer of the year award organized by International photography awards (IPA) – Winner
2016, CBRE UPOTY Urban Photographer of the Year – Asia regional winner
2017, "Sente Antu Cup" International Photo Contest by Global Photography – Winner.
2017, The Biennial's Grant for Photography organized by the Biennial of Fine Art & Documentary Photography - Runners Up.
2017, Shining a Light: Experiences of Refugee Women International Photography Contest exhibition Organized by Muhammad Ali Center – Winner.
2017, Allard Prize for International Integrity – Winner
2017, UNICEF photo of the year 2017 _ "Second Place"
2018, The NPPA's Best of Photojournalism 2018 Category: Contemporary Issues Story – Honorable Mention
2017–2018, Hamdan International Photography Award (HIPA) 'The Moment' Category winner – 1st Place
2018, International Photography Awards Editorial-Others – Honorable Mention
2018, International Photography Awards Deeper Perspective – 3rd Place
2018, International Photography Awards Editorial Photo Essay and Feature Story – 1st Place
2018, The Alfred Fried Photography Award - Special Award of the Jury
2018, FOTODOC Center for Documentary Photography Direct Look photo contest The Conflict category – 3rd Place
2018, "Sente Antu Cup" International Photo Contest by Global Photography – Runner-Up.
2018, Xposure International Competitions - Runner-Up
2018, Siena International Photo AwardsSiena International Photo Awards – "Photographer of the Year 2018"
2021, 3rd Prize, Singles, Environment category, World Press Photo

References

Bangladeshi photographers
1983 births
Living people
Bangladeshi photojournalists
Documentary photographers